Jamie Hughes may refer to:

 Jamie Hughes (footballer) (born 1977), English footballer, the first British footballer to fail a test for a performance-enhancing drug
 Jamie Hughes (darts player) (born 1986), English darts player